Menduh Thaçi (born 3 March 1965) is a Macedonian politician of Kosovan descent. He is the leader of the Macedonian political party Democratic Party of Albanians.

Thaçi was born in Tetovo and his parents were both from Kosovo, he is the fifth of six children. He attended primary and secondary school in Tetovo  and graduated from the University of Pristina.

He has been an active politician for 20 years. He started as vice-president of the Party for Democratic Prosperity of Albanians (PDPA). In 1997 a merger was formed between the Party for Democratic Prosperity of Albanians (PDPA) and the People's Democratic Party (PDP).

He was vice-president until the year 2006, at that time he was chosen President of the Party, after Arbën Xhaferi resigned.

As of July 2012, along with DUI vice-president Xhevat Ademi, president of New Democracy Kastriot Haxhirexha, and seven other Macedonian Albanian political figures for involvement in the 2001 ethnic Albanian insurgency.

References

1965 births
Living people
People from Tetovo
Albanians in North Macedonia
Democratic Party of Albanians politicians